Walking on Water is a 2018 international coproduction documentary film directed by Andrey Paounov. It chronicles The Floating Piers, Christo's first major project after the death of his wife and long-time collaborator Jeanne-Claude.

References

External links 

2018 documentary films
Italian documentary films
German documentary films
American documentary films
Emirati documentary films
2010s English-language films
2010s American films
2010s German films